Anechurinae is a subfamily of earwigs in the family Forficulidae. There are about 9 genera and more than 70 described species in Anechurinae.

Genera
These nine genera belong to the subfamily Anechurinae:
 Anechura Scudder, 1876
 Chelidura Latreille, 1825
 Eumegalura Bey-Bienko, 1934
 Mesasiobia Semenov, 1908
 Neopterygida Srivastava, 1984
 Oreasiobia Semenov, 1936
 Perirrhytus Burr, 1911
 Pseudochelidura Verhoeff, 1902
 Pterygida Verhoeff, 1902

References

Further reading

 
 

Forficulidae